Service provider interface (SPI) is an API intended to be implemented or extended by a third party. It can be used to enable framework extension and replaceable components.

Details
From Java documentation:

The concept can be extended to other platforms using the corresponding tools. In the Java Runtime Environment, SPIs are used in:

Java Database Connectivity
Java Cryptography Extension
Java Naming and Directory Interface
Java API for XML Processing
Java Business Integration
Java Sound
Java Image I/O
Java File Systems

See also
Plug-in (computing)
Java (programming language)
Java (software platform)

References

External links
Replaceable Components and the Service Provider Interface (.pdf at The Software Engineering Institute CMU)
Official Java API documentation: java.util.class and [http://com/javase/4/docs/api/java/util/spi/package-estary.html java.util.spi package

Technical communication
Application programming interfaces